Joseph Anglade (1868–1930) was a French philologist. He specialized in Romance languages, particularly Occitan, and studied the lyrics of the troubadours. He was instrumental in formalizing the term Occitan for the language of Provence.

He founded the Societat d'Estudis Occitans (SEO) in Toulouse, a predecessor of the Institut d'Estudis Occitans.

Career

Joseph Anglade became a college and faculty professor in Toulouse where he taught southern languages and literature.

He published numerous works on Occitan, the troubadours, and their history, including a grammar of the Old Provençal, and founded a Southern Resource Center (Institute of Southern Studies), of which the Occitan and Southern Resource Center is today the heir.

From 1918 until his death, he was a board member of Félibrige.

Works
 Le Troubadour Guiraud Riquier. Étude sur la décadence de l'ancienne poésie provençale (1905)
 Les Troubadours, leurs vies, leurs œuvres, leur influence (1908)
 La Bataille de Muret (1913)
 Onomastique des troubadours (1916)
 Poésies du Troubadour Peire Raimon de Toulouse (1920)
 Histoire sommaire de la littérature méridionale au Moyen-Âge (1921)
 Anthologie des troubadours (1927)
 Les Troubadours de Toulouse (1928)
 Les Troubadours et les Bretons (1929)
 Pour étudier les patois méridionaux. Notice bibliographique
 Grammaire élémentaire de l'ancien français
 Grammaire de l'Ancien Provençal ou ancienne Langue d'Oc. Phonétique & morphologie
 Notes sur l'emploi de l'article en français

References

External links 
 
 

1868 births
1930 deaths
20th-century French non-fiction writers
20th-century French male writers
French philologists
Occitan-language writers
Romance philologists
French male non-fiction writers